Epichlorops is a genus of grass flies in the family Chloropidae. There are at least 4 described species in Epichlorops.

Species
 Epichlorops elongatus Wheeler, 1994
 Epichlorops exilis (Coquillett, 1898)
 Epichlorops puncticollis (Zetterstedt, 1848)
 Epichlorops scaber (Coquillett, 1898)

References

Further reading

External links

 Diptera.info

Chloropinae